Pedro Henrique "Pepe" Gonçalves da Silva (born 12 April 1993 in Ipaussu) is a Brazilian slalom canoeist who has competed at the international level since 2009.

Early life
Raised in Piraju, da Silva got interested in canoeing after seeing the Brazilian team that would participate in the 2004 Summer Olympics practice in his city. He joined a social project that taught the sport in the Paranapanema River and got moved to sailing for a year due to his low stature, but his abilities in the kayak soon convinced his teachers. Once moved from sprint to slalom, Gonçalves won his first Brazilian championship in 2011, nearly qualified for the 2012 Summer Olympics - missing the qualifying time by 0.13 seconds - and got a silver medal at the 2015 Pan American Games.

Career
Gonçalves won a bronze medal in the Extreme K1 event at the 2019 World Championships in Prague. He also won the overall World Cup title in Extreme K1 in 2019.

Gonçalves competed at two Olympic Games. He finished 6th in the K1 event at the 2016 Summer Olympics in Rio de Janeiro, the best result the country ever had in this sport. He also competed at the delayed 2020 Summer Olympics in Tokyo, where he finished 19th in the K1 event after being eliminated in the semifinal.

World Cup individual podiums

1 Although the K1 cross events were contested, no World Cup points were awarded
2 World Championship counting for World Cup points

Personal life
He lives in Foz do Iguaçu, where he trains and studies physiotherapy.

Controversy
During the 2016 Olympics, he made news for being brought by diver Ingrid de Oliveira to her bedroom, causing tension between Oliveira and her partner Giovanna Pedroso as both would compete in the women's 10-meter synchronized platform dive the next day.

References

External links 

 Pedro Enrique Gon DA SILVA at CanoeSlalom.net

1993 births
Living people
Brazilian male canoeists
Sportspeople from São Paulo (state)
Canoeists at the 2016 Summer Olympics
Olympic canoeists of Brazil
Pan American Games medalists in canoeing
Pan American Games gold medalists for Brazil
Pan American Games silver medalists for Brazil
Canoeists at the 2015 Pan American Games
Canoeists at the 2019 Pan American Games
Medalists at the ICF Canoe Slalom World Championships
Medalists at the 2015 Pan American Games
Medalists at the 2019 Pan American Games
Canoeists at the 2020 Summer Olympics
People from Piraju